"General" Daniel Pratt, Jr. (born April 11, 1809 in Prattville, Chelsea, Massachusetts; died June 21, 1887 in Boston) was an American itinerant speaker, author, performance artist, eccentric, and poet.

Life and work
Pratt trained as a carpenter but abandoned this craft and wandered about the country doing freelance lecturing. He claimed to have walked over 200,000 miles, from Maine to the Dakotas, visiting 27 states and 16 Indian tribes.  He was widely known as the "Great American Traveler," which was how he referred to himself with his characteristic disdain for modesty.  His visits to American colleges came to be regarded by the students almost as a regular feature of campus life.

He was often an appreciated and honored guest and speaker, though usually met with tongue-in-cheek praise.  At times, though, his welcome came pre-worn-out, as when he rushed in on Leonard Bacon as he was entertaining guests at home, shook his hand and announced expectantly, "I, Sir, am no less a man than Daniel Pratt – Daniel Pratt, Sir, the great American traveler!"  Dr. Bacon, unimpressed, replied, "All right – Travel!"

Pratt was a prolific and generous generator of ideas, but in spite of this was heard to complain that "it was utterly impossible for him to talk fast enough to get out his ideas, so rapidly did they grow in his fertile brain."

Lectures
Pratt lectured widely, not only on university campuses, but in town halls, churches, and wherever he could find an audience.  He would attend meetings of many varieties, from religious ceremonies to city government meetings to women's suffrage conventions, with the hopes of being able to address the assembly.

One newspaper announcement from 1853 invited readers to "a LECTURE on The Laws of Mind and Matter, at the lecture-room of Hope Chapel… The Universe is a globe of laws, and the whole animate creation exists and is governed by them.  There is an infinite power above them all, and manifested in different bodies, subject to the will of the Law giver of Nature.  Ladies, free; gentlemen, 25 cents."  Another, from 1864, advertised "the Hon. DANIEL PRATT, the Great American Traveler and editor of the famous Gridiron, and author of a work entitled the 'Beacon Light,' and candidate for the Presidency, on the power of Master Leading Mind and the War Equilibrium, interspersed with poetry and anecdotes, at the Apollo Rooms… Tickets admitting a gentleman and ladies, fifty cents. Single tickets twenty-five cents, to be had at the door on the evening of the oration."

Pratt would appear in "threadbare coat," "battered tall hat, seedy attire, and imperturbable solemnity of countenance" and deliver his talk, "characterized by a dazzling faculty for word-creation, a complete mastery of the non-sequitur, and a lambent humor."  Afterwards, if there had been no admission price, he'd pass the hat.

One author remembers seeing Pratt on campus:

The students then nominated Pratt for the US presidency, and passed the hat to buy him a new pair of shoes and a meal.

One journalist recalled an occasion on which Pratt lost his notes but did not lose his composure:

His remarks were written in two-inch-caliber chirography on the reverse of a roll of wall-paper, which the orator unwrapped as he proceeded until he was almost lost to view in the billows of white.  Once an unprincipled sophomore crept up behind him and touched a lighted match to the manuscript. For a moment the perpetual candidate resembled a plate in Fox's "Book of Martyrs"; but without the slightest change of expression he trampled out the flaming Vocabulary Laboratory and went on calmly…

Only partial transcripts of Pratt's lectures have been found, but many times they were referred to by title or subject in the popular press of the time.  The Brooklyn Eagle considered "Equilibrium" to be Pratt's signature lecture topic.  George H. Genzmer noted topics like "The Four Kingdoms," "The Harmony of the Human Mind," "The Solar System," and "The Vocabulaboratory of the World's History."

A journalist paraphrased one of Pratt's lectures thus:

Gentlemen, I have come up through great tribulation.  I am in possession of a vast profundity of knowledge on the sciences of the universe, that when written out and published will be worth thousands of millions of dollars to our nation.  God has favored me physically and mentally from my birth.  The time has come for the industrial and educational sciences to be represented at the head of the American Government.  And I have been speaking over twenty-five years on different subjects, almost without pay.  I have spoken thousands of times without one cent or a crumb of bread or a place to lay my head.  I have also spoken over a hundred times since last June from New York City to Toledo, Ohio, and all the presidents of the railroads have paid me was one dollar and a half.  Man is the architect of his own weal.  My circular entitled 'The Pratt Intellectual Zenith' is progressing.

Because of his high self-regard and his eccentric subject matter and delivery, Pratt was often subjected to mockery, sometimes of a cruel nature.  On one occasion during the U.S. Civil War, he was lecturing to a regiment of Union army troops, who slipped forged correspondence from Confederate president Jefferson Davis in his pockets. Pratt was arrested on charge of being a spy, sentenced to death in a mock trial, blindfolded, and 
"shot" by a dozen riflemen using blank cartridges.

Debates
Pratt periodically challenged the intellects of his day to debates. He once challenged William Lloyd Garrison and Wendell Phillips to a debate on "the virtues of the Abolition Party and Political Platform." On another occasion he challenged Henry Ward Beecher, Edwin H. Chapin and Andrew Jackson Davis to a debate on "which is the smartest man in all points of view." In April 1854, he shared the stage with an all-star cast of eccentrics, including Father Lamson and John S. Orr ("The Angel Gabriel") before an audience of thousands in Boston.

Writing
Pratt wrote a periodical, the Gridiron, as a tribune for his considered opinions, and also published broadsides and a book or two. In 1852, he announced the publication of "a work… on the glories and wonders of the universe, in map form." In 1882 The Tech — MIT's student newspaper – gave this description of Pratt's work:

Political campaigns
Pratt witnessed the inauguration of five presidents, and is said to have believed that he himself had been elected president but defrauded of the office. He was a frequent presidential candidate. One of his abbreviated campaign platforms was printed as a letter-to-the-editor in 1855:

Fellow Citizens, As I am a Member of the Press, Editor, Author and Publisher and Candidate for the next President of the United States of America in 56, It is due the People, that I give them some idea, of my Political Platform, I am for the Constitution right or wrong, I know no East, west, north or South, but my country, the People, the whole, People. If it had not been for Emigration, America would be people by the Indians and the wild beasts, Emigrants has built up and inriched America, I am in favor of holding up our identity as an Nation, to all Nations in the world, to Nationalize all Nations who come under the stars and stripes of the American Flag. It will take eight years to right up, and set the broken limbs of the People who compose our Nation. I want a Lady, of talent, and a little money, who never was Married to address me, by Letter at the New York Post office, in good faith, all confidential. I challenge in good faith the Hon. George Law, to meet me in some good Hall in this City, to give the People an opportunity of Judging who is the most available man for the President of the U.S.A.

Pratt occasionally came into conflict with another Boston eccentric with presidential aspirations, George Washington Mellen. At one point, Mellen accused Pratt of accepting £250,000 from the Pope in preparations for raising a large army of insurgents to take on the United States government. Pratt responded to this slander by accusing Mellen with high treason.

Pratt spoke at the 22nd Anniversary of the founding of the American Anti-Slavery Society in 1856, as the New York Times reported:

Daniel Pratt, Esq.… Let him that is sent of God preach.  Listen, for I am not going to make a speech.  In this great country the Government was founded by the people; it was founded by the people for the people; and I am for the laboring classes.  I don't think it is right for man to enslave his fellow-man.  It is to God and this great and glorious country's institutions that I owe my present high, exalted position. [Applause.] It is to it that I owe my many hair-breadth escapes, during my great travels and perils by land and sea and mountain. [Great applause.]

A Gentleman on the Platform — I submit, Mr. President, Is the gentleman in order?

The President — I trust the audience will bear with this particular case. I think it will not last long. (Turning to Mr. Pratt) Please, Sir, to be as short as possible.

Mr. Daniel Pratt, (continuing) — I'll wind up with a poem. [Enthusiastic applause] But, perhaps, as my name has not been announced, some of you may not know who I am, and so I'd better tell you, so that you may know. I am Daniel Pratt, Esq., the great American traveler and independent candidate for the Presidency – and I won't flinch a hair, [Enthusiastic applause and a few hisses.] Now I'll read the poem, It is

In 1864, Pratt went to see President Lincoln at the White House, and "left a roll of printed and written paper" for the president to peruse. The president, busy with the duties of his office, did not understand what he had received and returned the papers to Pratt via a White House staffer, with instructions to receive no further papers. Pratt felt this insult sorely, as he, in spite of his regular campaigning to himself fill Lincoln's office, considered himself one of the president's most hard-working supporters. The newspapers from Washington reported the encounter in the most unflattering terms, saying that "a crazy man had got into the White House, had harrangued the President, and had endeavored to convince that functionary that he (the crazy man) had been elected President in 1856.… [Guards] seized the intruder and bore him from the sight of the offended Executive."

In 1867, the students of Trinity College in Connecticut, in response to one of Pratt's speeches (which the papers described as "a highly polished, scholarly affair, abounding in flowers of rhetoric and striking similes"), unanimously nominated Pratt to run for the United States presidency. They nominated a favorite African-American janitor, "Professor" James Williams, as his running mate.

"Persistency finds its practical incarnation in the person of Pratt," the Brooklyn Eagle wrote, in an editorial endorsement of sorts of Pratt's 1867 campaign.  "[H]e has been nominated by over twenty colleges, and if he can only get the Electoral College, of which there is little doubt, he will be all right." Pratt eventually abandoned this campaign so as not to hurt the candidacy of Ulysses S. Grant.

Honors
The June 1870 Hamilton Literary Magazine reported:

Among the many trophies in the State Police Headquarters, in Boston, is a pewter pitcher, seized at a saloon on Causeway street, which is inscribed: "Presented to Daniel Pratt, Jr., Chelsea, the Great American Traveller, Orator and Patriot; the Friend of Humanity, the Ladies, and a Free Country generally; the Defender of the Rich and Juicy, wherever found, and however bound.  Testimonials from Citizens and Admirers, at Grove Hall, Dorchester, August 15, 1845.

George H. Genzmer wrote that Pratt was "the most widely known and affectionately remembered man of his class, the subject of innumerable anecdotes, reminiscences, rhymes, and allusions. This fame he owed in large measure to his devotion to the New England colleges, where … by the students he was received with an enthusiasm that quickly permeated the community and mounted to a height of ebullient demonstration scarcely distinguishable from a riot.… An impressive but quite unofficial convocation at Dartmouth College conferred on him the degree of C.O.D."

A poem in Pratt's honor has been preserved, though its context does not indicate who composed it and hints that it may have been Pratt himself:

Oh, where is the man so lean and fat
Who has not heard of Daniel Pratt,
Who gathers his wings and flies away
To parts of earth were the light of day
Shines but a little or not at all
In the course of the awful waterfall?
I ask you, friends, what muddy minds
Have never conceived, unfurled to the winds
That glorious banner that springs like a cat
Into the air for Daniel Pratt.
There never was nor ever will be
Such a mighty man to stand like thee,
I say, most magnificent Daniel Pratt,
Above the throne where Plato sat!

Quotations

Notes

Pratt, Walter M. Seven generations: a story of Prattville and Chelsea 1930
Wright, Richardson Hawkers & Walkers in Early America 1927

External links
 http://memory.loc.gov/rbc/rbpe/rbpe07/rbpe076/07601200/001dr.jpg The saving properties of the solar system! The law of necessity the law of all laws. One thousand billion dollars sun for 25 cents. Six thousand years war with the natural laws. — A JPEG image of one of Pratt's broadsides from Boston in 1882, from the Library of Congress's An American Time Capsule

1809 births
1887 deaths
Writers from Boston
Writers from Chelsea, Massachusetts
Candidates in the 1856 United States presidential election